Hsu Chih-ling (born 1 September 1975) is a Taiwanese taekwondo practitioner.

She competed at the 2000 Summer Olympics in Sydney. She won a gold medal in lightweight at the 1998 Asian Games in Bangkok.

References

External links

1975 births
Living people
Taiwanese female taekwondo practitioners
Olympic taekwondo practitioners of Taiwan
Taekwondo practitioners at the 2000 Summer Olympics
Taekwondo practitioners at the 1998 Asian Games
Asian Games medalists in taekwondo
Medalists at the 1998 Asian Games
Asian Games gold medalists for Chinese Taipei
20th-century Taiwanese women